WSB Universities – group of state-recognized private (non-public) universities in Poland (Poznań, Chorzów, Gdańsk, Toruń, Wrocław)
 WSB University – state-recognized private (non-public) university in Poland (Dąbrowa Górnicza, Kraków, Żywiec, Olkusz, Cieszyn)

